Khushpur is a village in Samundri Tehsil of Faisalabad District in the province of Punjab in Pakistan. It is at 31°7'0N 72°53'0E with an altitude of 167 metres (551 feet). Neighboring settlements include Nara Dada and Rashiana. There is a large Christian community in Khushpur.

References

Villages in Faisalabad District
Christianity in Punjab, Pakistan
Christian communities of Pakistan